Jesús González Díaz (born 7 January 1994), sometimes known as just Jesús, is a Spanish professional footballer who currently plays as a centre back for Hong Kong Premier League club Sham Shui Po.

Club career
Born in Seville, Andalusia, Gonzalez joined Sevilla FC's youth setup in 2004 at the age of ten. He made his senior debut with the club's C-team on 3 February 2013, starting in a 0–2 Tercera División away loss against Atlético de Ceuta.

In August 2015 Gonzalez moved to Segunda División B club Mérida AD, becoming a regular starter for the side. On 27 August of the following year he signed for another reserve team, Getafe CF B in the fourth tier.

Gonzalez made his first team debut on 25 February 2017, starting in a 1–0 home win against Rayo Vallecano in the Segunda División. On 24 July he moved to another reserve team, Deportivo Aragón in the third level.

On 11 January 2023, Gonzalez joined Sham Shui Po.

References

External links

1994 births
Living people
Spanish footballers
Spanish expatriate footballers
Footballers from Seville
Association football defenders
Segunda División players
Segunda División B players
Tercera División players
Hong Kong Premier League players
Sevilla FC C players
Mérida AD players
Getafe CF B players
Getafe CF footballers
Real Zaragoza B players
Atlético Astorga FC players
Sham Shui Po SA players
Expatriate soccer players in the United States
Expatriate footballers in Hong Kong